The following is a list of Renaissance humanists, individuals whose careers threw light on the movement as a whole.

List
 Barlaam of Seminara (c. 1290-1348) (Italian)
 Leontius Pilatus (?-1364/1366) (Greek)
 Francesco Petrarca (1304-1374) (Italian)
 Giovanni Boccaccio (1313–1375) (Italian)
 Simon Atumano (?-c.1380) (Greco-Turkish)
 Francesc Eiximenis (c. 1330–1409) (Aragonese)
 Coluccio Salutati (1331–1406) (Italian)
 Geert Groote (1340–1384) (Dutch)
 Bernat Metge (c.1340–1413) (Aragonese)
 Manuel Chrysoloras (c.1355–1415) (Greek)
 George Gemistos Plethon (c.1355–1452/1454) (Greek)
 Niccolò de' Niccoli (1364–1437) (Italian)
 Leonardo Bruni (c.1369–1444) (Italian)
 Guarino da Verona (1370–1460) (Italian)
 Vittorino da Feltre (1378–1446) (Italian)
 Poggio Bracciolini (1380–1459) (Italian)
 Cosimo de' Medici (1389–1464) (Italian)
 Tommaso Parentucelli (Pope Nicholas V) (1391–1455) (Italian)
 Peter, Duke of Coimbra (1392–1449) (Portuguese)
 Flavio Biondo (1392–1463) (Italian)
 Antonio Beccadelli (1394–1471) (Italian)
 George of Trebizond (1395–1486) (Greek)
 Giannozzo Manetti (1396–1459) (Italian)
 Francesco Filelfo (1398–1481) (Italian)
 Carlo Marsuppini (1399–1453) (Italian)
 Íñigo López de Mendoza, marqués de Santillana (1398–1458) (Spanish)
 Gjon Gazulli (1400–1465) (Albanian)
 Theodorus Gaza (c.1400–1475) (Greek)
 Nicholas of Cusa (1401–1469) (German)
 Bessarion (1403–1472) (Greek)
 Gregory of Sanok (1403/07–1477) (Polish)
 Aeneas Sylvius Piccolomini (Pope Pius II) (1405–1464) (Italian)
 John Vitéz (1408–1472) (Croatian/Hungarian)
 Bartolomeo Facio (1410–1457) (Italian/Neapolitan)
 Isotta Nogarola (1418-1466) (Italian)
 Wessel Gansfort (1419-1489) (Frisian)
 Bartolomeo Platina (1421–1481) (Italian/Roman)
 Vespasiano da Bisticci (1421–1498) (Italian)
 Giovanni Pontano (1426–1503) (Italian/Neapolitan)
 Julius Pomponius Laetus (1428–1498) (Italian/Roman)
 Niccolò Perotti (1429–1480) (Italian)
 Marsilio Ficino (1433–1499) (Italian/Florentine)
 Janus Pannonius (1434–1472) (Hungarian/Croatian)
 John Doget (c.1434–1501) (English)
 Antonio Bonfini (1434–1503) (Italian)
 Stefano Infessura (c.1435-c.1500) (Italian)
 Francisco Jiménez de Cisneros (1436–1517) (Spanish)
 Filippo Buonaccorsi (1437–1496) (Italian/ Tuscan)
 Giovanni Michele Alberto da Carrara (1438–1490) (Italian)
 Antonio de Nebrija (1441–1522) (Spanish)
 Martin Segon (?–1482/85) (Serbian)
 Rodolphus Agricola (1443–1485) (Frisian)
 Lucio Marineo Siculo (1444–1533) (Italian)
 Janus Lascaris (c.1445–1535) (Greek)
 Juraj Šižgorić (1445–1509) (Croatian)
 William Grocyn (c.1446–1519) (English)
 Aldus Manutius (1449–1515) (Italian/Venetian)
 Yuriy Drohobych (1450-1494) (Ukrainian)
 Marko Marulić (1450-1524) (Croatian)
 Marin Barleti (c.1450–c.1512/13) (Albanian/Venetian)
 Johannes Stöffler (1452–1531) (German)
 Angelo Poliziano (1454-1494) (Italian/Florentine)
 Johann Reuchlin (1455–1522) (German)
 Paulus Aemilius Veronensis (1455–1529) (Italian/Venetian)
 Jacques Lefèvre d'Étaples (1455–1536) (French)
 Nicholas Leonicus Thomaeus (1456–1531) (Albanian or Greek)
 Peter Martyr d'Anghiera (1457–1526) (Italian)
 Jacopo Sannazaro (1458–1530) (Italian)
 Conrad Celtes (1459–1508) (German)
 Džore Držić (1461–1501) (Croatian)
 Johannes Trithemius (1462–1516) (German)
 Giovanni Pico della Mirandola (1463–1494) (Italian)
 Cassandra Fedele (1465-1558) (Italian)
 Hector Boece (1465–1536) (Scottish)
 Laurentius Corvinus (1465–1527) (Silesian)
 Desiderius Erasmus (1466–1536) (Dutch)
 Marinus Becichemus Scodrensis (1468–1526) (Albanian)
 Niccolò Machiavelli (1469–1527) (Italian/Florentine)
 Laura Cereta (1469-1499) (Italian)
 Aires de Figueiredo Barbosa (1470–1540) (Portuguese)
 Janus Parrhasius (1470–1522) (Italian)
 Pietro Bembo (1470–1547) (Italian)
 Polydore Vergil (1470–1555) (Italian/English)
 Ludovico Ariosto (1474–1533) (Italian)
Alessandra Scala (1475-1506)(Italian)
 Thomas More (1478–1535) (English)
 Baldassare Castiglione (1478–1529) (Italian)
 Raphael Sanzio (1483–1520) (Italian)
 Bartolomé de las Casas (1484–1566) (Spanish)
 Beatus Rhenanus (1485–1547) (German)
 Pieter Gillis (1486–1533) (Flemish)
 Sigismund von Herberstein (1486–1566) (Austrian/Slovene)
 Macropedius (1487–1558) (Dutch)
 Pietro Alcionio (c.1487–1527) (Italian)
 William Farel (1489–1565) (French/Swiss)
 Alfonso de Valdés (1490–1532) (Spanish)
 Joan Boscà i Almogàver (c.1490?–1542) (Spanish)
 Pietro Aretino (1492–1556) (Italian/Tuscan)
 Joan Lluís Vives i March (1492–1540) (Spanish/Valencian)
 François Rabelais (c.1494–1553) (French)
 Juan Ginés de Sepúlveda (1494-1573) (Spanish)
 Philipp Melanchthon (1497–1560) (German)
 Pier Paolo Vergerio (1498–1565) (Italian)
 André de Resende (1498–1573) (Portuguese)
 Janus Cornarius (1500–1558) (German)
 Damião de Góis (1502–1574) (Portuguese)
 Giovanni della Casa (1503–1556) (Italian)
 George Buchanan (1506–1582) (Scottish)
 Arnoldus Arlenius (c.1510–1582) (Dutch)
 Michael Servetus (1511–1553) (Spanish)
 Francesco Robortello (1516–1567) (Italian)
 Johannes Goropius Becanus (1519–1572) (Dutch)
 Giovanni Valentino Gentile (c. 1520-1566) (Italian)
 Étienne de La Boétie (1530–1563) (French)
 Giovan Battista Pigna (1530-1575) Italian poet, court historian, and author of military works
 Michel de Montaigne (1533–1592) (French)
 Paul Skalich (1534–1573) (Croatian)
 Alphonsus Ciacconius (1540–1599) (Spanish)
 Justus Lipsius (1547–1606) (Flemish)
 Giordano Bruno (1548–1600)  (Italian)
 Fausto Veranzio (1551–1617) (Croatian)
 Ignazio Cardini (1566–1602) (Corsican/Italian)
 Thomas Reid (?–1624) (Scottish)
 David Hume of Godscroft (1558–1629) (Scottish)
 Gian Vittorio Rossi (1577–1647) Italian poet, philologist, and historian.

See also 
 List of Renaissance commentators on Aristotle
 Greek scholars in the Renaissance

Lists of Renaissance people